Sir Roger Alexander Deakins  (born 24 May 1949) is an English cinematographer, best known for his collaborations with directors the Coen brothers, Sam Mendes, and Denis Villeneuve. Deakins has been admitted to both the British Society of Cinematographers and to the American Society of Cinematographers. He is the recipient of five BAFTA Awards for Best Cinematography, and two Academy Awards for Best Cinematography from sixteen nominations. His best-known works include The Shawshank Redemption (1994), Fargo (1996), O Brother, Where Art Thou? (2000), A Beautiful Mind (2001), Skyfall (2012), Sicario (2015), Blade Runner 2049 (2017), and 1917 (2019), the last two of which earned him Academy Awards.

An alumnus of the National Film and Television School, in recognition of his "outstanding contribution[s] to ... British film" Deakins was named and serves as an Honorary Fellow of the school. Deakins received a Lifetime Achievement Award from the American Society of Cinematographers in 2011, and in 2013 he was bestowed a CBE by the Palace for his services to film. In the 2021 New Year Honours he was knighted as a Knight Bachelor.

Early life
Deakins was born in Torquay in the English county of Devon. His father ran a construction company, while his mother was an actress and amateur painter. Deakins attended Torquay Boys' Grammar School. He took up painting from a young age, and subsequently enrolled in the Bath Academy of Art in Bath, Somerset, where he studied graphic design. While studying in Bath, Deakins developed a passion for photography; he cited the photographer Roger Mayne, who was then a guest lecturer at the academy, as a major source of inspiration.

After college, Deakins applied to the newly opened National Film School, but was denied admission as his photography was considered not "filmic" enough. He spent the following year wandering the countryside, photographing rural life in North Devon, before finally being admitted to the National Film School in 1972. Director Michael Radford was one of Deakins's schoolmates.

Career

Early career
After graduating, Deakins found work as a cameraman, assisting in the production of projects for about seven years. An early project of his involved filming a nine-month trip on a yacht as an entrant of the Whitbread Round the World Race, titled Around the World with Ridgeway. Deakins was hired to film two documentaries in Africa. His first, Zimbabwe, was a clandestine documentation of the Rhodesian Bush War, while his second, Eritrea – Behind Enemy Lines, depicted the Eritrean War of Independence. He also shot anthropological documentaries in India and Sudan.

During the late 1970s and early 1980s, Deakins was involved in a number of music-related projects, including Blue Suede Shoes, a music documentary about the British rockabilly scene, the concert film Van Morrison in Ireland, and the Ray Davies musical film Return to Waterloo. He also made short music videos for Herbie Hancock, Eric Clapton, Marvin Gaye, Tracey Ullman, Madness, Level 42 and Meat Loaf.

Feature films
Deakins's first dramatic project was a miniseries titled Wolcott, about a black detective working in the East End of London. The camerawork of the miniseries impressed his former schoolmate and frequent collaborator Michael Radford, who enlisted Deakins for their first dramatic feature, the 1983 film Another Time, Another Place. The film screened at the Cannes Film Festival and was well-received; subsequently, Deakins and Radford teamed up again on Nineteen Eighty-Four (1984), based upon George Orwell's novel of the same name. The film was praised for its bold, unusual palette, which Deakins achieved through a process known as bleach bypass, where the silver is retained in the print, creating a washed-out look that reflected Orwell's bleak vision. Deakins was the first Western cinematographer to use the technique, which has since become highly influential and could be seen in films such as Seven (1995) and Saving Private Ryan (1998). Throughout the 1980s, Deakins continued working in Britain, serving as cinematographer for films including Defence of the Realm (1986), Sid and Nancy (1986), White Mischief (1987; his third feature film with Radford), Stormy Monday (1988) and Pascali's Island (1988).

In 1991, Deakins began his long-term collaboration with the Coen brothers, starting with the film Barton Fink. The Coens had been impressed with Deakins's work, and reached out to him after their previous collaborator Barry Sonnenfeld left to pursue a career in directing. The film won the Coens' the Festival de Cannes 1991 Palme d'Or and Best Director awards (and John Turturro the award for Best Actor), and earned Deakins best cinematography awards from New York, Chicago and Los Angeles film critics circles.

In 1994, the year Deakins was admitted to the American Society of Cinematographers, he served as cinematographer for The Shawshank Redemption, which earned him his first Academy Award nomination for Best Cinematography, and his first American Society of Cinematographers Award. He received two further Academy Award nominations in that decade, for Fargo (1996) and Kundun (1997).

For the Coen brothers film O Brother, Where Art Thou? (2000), Deakins spent some two months fine-tuning the look, turning the lush green Mississippi landscape into a burnt, autumnal yellow and desaturating the overall image. This feat made O Brother the first ever feature film to be digitally color-corrected in its entirety, and earned Deakins his fourth Academy Award nomination. The following year, for his work in the Coen brothers' The Man Who Wasn't There (2001), Deakins received his fifth Oscar nomination and won his first BAFTA Award for Best Cinematography.

In 2008, Deakins received dual Oscar nominations—his sixth and seventh—for The Assassination of Jesse James by the Coward Robert Ford (2007) and No Country for Old Men (2007). He was the first cinematographer to achieve such a feat since Robert Surtees, who was nominated for The Last Picture Show and Summer of '42 in 1972. Deakins served as director of photography for Stephen Daldry's The Reader (2008) but left mid-production due to delays and previous commitments, and was replaced by Chris Menges. The two cinematographers received a shared nomination for Best Cinematography at the 81st Academy Awards.

Deakins worked with the Coens on the 2010 western True Grit—their eleventh collaboration—for which he received his ninth Oscar nomination.

Deakins signed on as cinematographer for Skyfall (2012), having previously worked with director Sam Mendes on Jarhead (2005) and Revolutionary Road (2008). For his work, Deakins received another Academy Award nomination for Best Cinematography, eventually losing to Claudio Miranda of Life of Pi—his 10th nomination without securing a win.

In addition to his live-action work, Deakins served as both cinematography and visual consultant on his animated work, Rango (2011), and also served as a visual consultant on animated features, including WALL-E (2008), Puss in Boots (2011), Rise of the Guardians (2012), The Croods (2013), the How to Train Your Dragon trilogy (2010, 2014 and 2019). and Vivo (2021).

Starting with Prisoners (2013), Deakins began working with director Denis Villeneuve. The two proceeded to collaborate on Sicario (2015) and Blade Runner 2049 (2017), with Deakins earning Oscar nominations for all three films. For his work on Blade Runner 2049, Deakins received his first Academy Award for Best Cinematography on his 14th nomination.

Deakins reunited with Sam Mendes on the 2019 war film 1917, filmed and edited to appear as one uninterrupted take, for which he received his second Academy Award on his 15th nomination.

Personal life
Deakins married Isabella James Purefoy Ellis (b. January 1954, professionally known as James Ellis Deakins and often referred to simply as James) on 11 December 1991. They had met in 1991 in Los Angeles on the set of David Mamet's Homicide, where she was working as the script supervisor. The two began dating after the Homicide production finished and were married within about six months. Since then, James Ellis has "ovesee[n] the digital workflow of... film[s]", and they have worked together on various projects, including The Goldfinch and 1917. As of February 2020, they reside in Kingswear, Devon, and Santa Monica, California.

Deakins has kept a boat since beginning such activities with his father as a child—with him, first a sailboat, then a motor boat—and he currently keeps one in Torquay, his hometown, to which he often goes (and from which he fishes) when in Britain. 

When in Devon he enjoys running, and has maintained a passion for still photography. In 2021, Deakins released a book of his black-and-white still photographs, Byways.

Since 2005, Deakins has maintained a website through which he frequently communicates with admirers and other industry practitioners. His correspondence includes answering fan questions and offering cinematography tips. Since April 2020 he and his wife have hosted the Team Deakins podcast, whose guests have included Sam Mendes, John Crowley, and Denis Villeneuve.

Filmography

Critical reception
Deakins is often cited as one of the greatest and most influential cinematographers of all time. His consistent output led fellow cinematographer Robert Elswit to jokingly suggest that the American Society of Cinematographers should establish a special award for "films shot by Roger Deakins." Deakins received 13 Academy Awards nominations without a win, a fact often lamented by journalists and film critics. His first Oscar win (on his 14th nomination) for Blade Runner 2049 at the 90th Academy Awards was widely reported and met with great enthusiasm.

Deakins is among the most respected and sought-after cinematographers in the film business. His involvement in a film could secure the casting of established stars—a distinction usually reserved for auteur directors. He was hired to shoot The Shawshank Redemption at the insistence of Tim Robbins, who had previously worked with him on the Coen brothers film The Hudsucker Proxy. Josh Brolin agreed to join the cast of Sicario only after hearing of Deakins's involvement. When Ryan Gosling accepted his role in Blade Runner 2049, he cited the involvement of Deakins as a factor for his decision.

Awards and recognition

He has been nominated for sixteen Academy Awards, winning the Academy Award for Best Cinematography twice—on his fourteenth and fifteenth nominations—for Blade Runner 2049 (2017) and 1917 (2019). He has been named as an Honorary Fellow of his alma mater, the National Film and Television School in Beaconsfield, Buckinghamshire, an honour which recognises "outstanding contribution to the British film and television industry" On 28 February 2020.

Deakins is the recipient of five BAFTA Awards for Best Cinematography, for The Man Who Wasn’t There (2001) in that same year, and for No Country for Old Men (2007), True Grit, Blade Runner 2049 (2017), 1917 (2019), each in the year following their release. As well, two films that he shot, Fargo (1996), and A Serious Man (2009), won Independent Spirit Awards for Best Cinematography in the year after their release.

He received the Royal Photographic Society's Lumière Award for major achievement in cinematography, video or animation in 2009.
The National Board of Review, a group of New York-based reviewers whose organization dates to 1909, honoured Deakins in 2007 with its award for Career Achievement in Cinematography. Deakins went on to receive the American Society of Cinematographers and the British Society of Cinematographers Lifetime Achievement Award in 2011 and 2015 respectively.

Deakins was appointed Commander of the Order of the British Empire (CBE) in the 2013 Birthday Honours for services to film. He was knighted in the 2021 New Year Honours, also for services to film.

References

External links
 
 Video interview with Roger Deakins, FILMdetail
 Filmed interview with Roger Deakins on The Reel Show
 I just had to pinch myself, interview with Roger Deakins on ITV Local Westcountry
 Information on Roger Deakins at the International Cinematographers Guild
 An interview with Roger Deakins from InDigest Magazine

1949 births
Living people
Alumni of Bath School of Art and Design
Alumni of the National Film and Television School
Best Cinematographer Academy Award winners
Best Cinematography BAFTA Award winners
British cinematographers
Commanders of the Order of the British Empire
English cinematographers
Independent Spirit Award winners
People educated at Torquay Boys' Grammar School
Knights Bachelor